Elin Hallagård (born 4 January 1989) is a Swedish female handball player for IK Sävehof and the Swedish national team.

Achievements 
SHE:
Winner: 2013, 2014, 2015, 2016

References

1989 births
Living people
Handball players from Gothenburg
Swedish female handball players
IK Sävehof players
21st-century Swedish women